The 2011 ADAC Formel Masters season was the fourth season of the ADAC Formel Masters open wheel auto racing series in Germany. The points system for the 2011 season changed to match the system used by the FIA for other championships such as Formula One. Points were awarded to the top ten drivers in each race as follows: 25, 18, 15, 12, 10, 8, 6, 4, 2, and 1. Pascal Wehrlein won seven of the 24 races and won the drivers' championship. Motopark Academy won the teams' title after their drivers Emil Bernstorff, Artem Markelov, Kean Kristensen and Mario Farnbacher occupied second, fourth, fifth and sixth place respectively. Sven Müller was third.

Teams and drivers

Race calendar and results
 The championship increased to eight rounds, one more than in 2010. Seven of eight race weekends were a part of the ADAC's Masters Weekend package, with an additional round at the Nürburgring to support the ADAC Truck Grand Prix.

Championship standings

Drivers' Championship
Points were awarded as follows:

Teams' Championship

References

External links
 Official Website 
 ADAC Masters Weekend 

ADAC Formel Masters
ADAC Formel Masters seasons
ADAC Formel Masters